A Driving Van Trailer (DVT) is a British purpose-built control car railway vehicle that allows the driver to operate with a locomotive in push-pull formation from the opposite end of a train. A key benefit of operating trains with DVTs is the requirement for fewer locomotives; for example, a second locomotive would otherwise have to join at the other end of the train after arrival at terminal stations to lead the train's onward journey. 

Unlike many other control cars, DVTs resemble locomotives, specifically Class 90 for the 82/1 mark 3 series and Class 91 for the 82/2 mark 4 series; thus when the train is operating in push mode, it does not appear to be travelling backwards. Historically, it was believed that a train would be unstable at high speeds unless pulled from the front; however, extensive testing and the experience of high speed trains with central power cars, such as the British Rail APT and the Eurostar, have since altered this view.

Development
The DVT concept is similar to the Mark 2 DBSO but, unlike its predecessor which was rebuilt from existing stock, it was a new build vehicle manufactured specifically for this purpose. The first design of DVT was designed to match Mark 2 and Mark 3 coaches. The second design has a narrower profile, similar to Mark 4 coaches, which would enable it to be converted to tilting operation if required in the future. The nose of the vehicle was styled to closely resemble the Class 90 and 91 locomotives that they were paired with.

The original Mark 3 DVTs, which operated on the West Coast Main Line, used the RCH jumpers to carry the signals, therefore allowing the same cables to be used for lighting and the public address system, as well as driver-guard signalling. The  and  locomotives had to be retrofitted with RCH cables, replacing the older multiple working jumpers that some of them had been fitted with.

The InterCity 225 sets operate on the East Coast Main Line; the Mark 4 DVTs and locomotives operate in push-pull formation utilising a time-division multiplexer to send control signals along specially screened cables which run the length of the train. The locomotives usually face north, away from London, only being changed occasionally in rare circumstances; this is because the Class 91 depots (formerly Bounds Green and now  Neville Hill) are situated at the north end of King's Cross and Leeds stations respectively, allowing easy changeover.

When a train is operated by a DVT, the control signals are encoded and multiplexed onto the cables by the TDM equipment in the DVT. At the locomotive, these signals are demultiplexed by the TDM equipment and the signals are used to control the locomotive. The air braking system is operated directly from whichever cab the driver is driving from. If the TDM fails and cannot be reconfigured, the train may still operate; however, if the DVT is leading, it will be necessary to uncouple the locomotive and attach it to the front of the train.

In addition to the driver's cab, some DVTs have luggage and cycle storage space and a guard's office. One DVT was fitted with a traction gel applicator. A number of Mark 3 DVTs have been fitted with generators to provide power to on-train equipment. One has been fitted with traction equipment, becoming the experimental Class 19 locomotive.

Mark 3 DVT

InterCity West Coast
British Rail Engineering Limited's Derby Litchurch Lane Works built 52 Mark 3 DVTs to operate with Mark 2 and Mark 3 sets in push-pull mode with Class 86, 87 and 90 locomotives on InterCity West Coast Main Line services from London Euston to Wolverhampton, Manchester, Liverpool and Glasgow allowing the retirement of the Class 81, 82, 83, 84 and 85 locomotives. The standard practice was for the DVT to be marshaled at the southern end, adjacent to the first class carriages, to allow easy changeover of locomotives at Willesden depot which is situated at the north end of London Euston station. The first was delivered in March 1989.

They also operated between Wolverhampton and Shrewsbury, and between Crewe and Holyhead, hauled by Class 47 diesel locomotives. The 47s always operated leading the train because these locomotives were not fitted with push-pull equipment.

As part of the privatisation of British Rail, all 52 were sold to Porterbrook in 1994 and were operated by InterCity West Coast franchise holder Virgin Trains West Coast from 1997 until the Mark 2 and Mark 3 sets were replaced by Class 390s between 2003 and 2005. In 2002, Mark 3 DVTs operated beyond the West Coast Main Line on a summer Saturday service from Manchester to Paignton with a Class 47 hauled Mark 3 set that was hired to Virgin CrossCountry.

Following the loss of a Class 390 Pendolino in the Grayrigg derailment, a Mark 3 set with a Driving Van Trailer was leased with a  hired from English Welsh & Scottish as required. In 2008, Virgin looked at leasing two  but decided to retain the Mark 3 set. Nicknamed the Pretendolino, this received re-upholstered seating, power points, wi-fi and a full Virgin external repaint at Wabtec, Doncaster in 2009. Virgin used this set with a Class 90 locomotive, hired from Freightliner, on a Euston to Crewe (via Birmingham) service on Fridays only until December 2012. From 9 December 2013, it was utilised to operate a London Euston - Birmingham New Street train on Thursdays and Fridays only, until its withdrawal in October 2014.

Greater Anglia
Mark 3 DVTs were introduced along with Mark 3 coach sets and Class 90s to the Greater Anglia franchise by National Express East Anglia, operating on the Great Eastern Main Line from London Liverpool Street to Norwich in 2004. They also were hauled by Class 47s from Norwich to Great Yarmouth on summer Saturday services. It was proposed that kitchens be fitted to the DVTs, but this did not proceed. All passed with the franchise to Greater Anglia in 2012.

In January 2020, the first Class 745s electric multiple units entered service. The locomotive-hauled sets were withdrawn from service, with the last set running on 24 March 2020.

The standard practice was for the DVT to be marshaled at the northern end, adjacent to the standard class carriages, to facilitate easy changeover of locomotives at Norwich Crown Point depot.

Silverlink
From September 2004 until July 2005, Silverlink operated two DVTs in conjunction with Mark 3 and EWS Class 90s on peak-time London Euston to Northampton services.

DB Cargo UK
EWS purchased DVT 82146 to operate as part of its DB Cargo Company Train that was launched in December 2004.

Hull Trains
In January 2008, DVT 82115 was hired to Hull Trains to operate services on the East Coast Main Line from London King's Cross to Doncaster, with a set of Cargo-D Mark 3s while it was short of rolling stock.

First ScotRail
During 2005, the Edinburgh - North Berwick services were operated by English Welsh & Scottish Class 90s with former Virgin Trains Mark 3 carriages and a Driving Van Trailer.

Wrexham & Shropshire
Wrexham & Shropshire started operating push-pull services with DVTs in October 2008 between London Marylebone and Wrexham General, with Mark 3s and Class 67 diesel locomotives. This followed the start of the service in April 2008, with Class 67s operating in top and tail formation. The DVTs required modification to work with the Class 67, involving adding a notched power controller as is used in the locomotive and a 27 wire jumper cable as used on the locomotives, which is known as the AAR multiple-working system. They were renumbered 82301 to 82305.

With the reduction in service levels from December 2010, a Mark 3 set was hired to Chiltern Railways to operate a Birmingham Moor Street to London Marylebone peak-hour service. The standard practice was for the DVT to be marshaled at the southern end.

Chiltern Railways
After Wrexham & Shropshire ceased in January 2011, its fleet of five DVTs were transferred to fellow DB Regio UK company Chiltern Railways and started operating on London Marylebone to Birmingham Snow Hill services with Mark 3s. They were modified to work with the power doors that were fitted to the Mark 3 coaches and to have a generator fitted to enable Electric Train Supply and compressed air to be provided to the coaches when the locomotive is not running, such as when in a terminus station and when stabled. Initially operated with Class 67s, they have been operated with Class 68s since December 2014. Some peak services were extended to Kidderminster. A sixth DVT (82309) was leased to operate with a Mark 3 set on a peak hour service from London Marylebone to Banbury. The standard practice is for the DVT to be marshaled at the southern end.

Network Rail
In early 2013, several DVTs, including 82111, 82124, 82129 and 82145 were acquired by Network Rail and modified to work with diesel locomotives for use on test trains. Part of the modification work includes the integration of a diesel generator to provide power for on-board systems.

Wales & Borders
In March 2012, three DVTs (82306-82308) were introduced along with Mark 3s and Class 67s on Arriva Trains Wales' Premier Service from Holyhead to Cardiff. They also operate on services from Crewe and Manchester to Holyhead and Llandudno. All passed with the Wales & Borders franchise to Transport for Wales in October 2018. All were withdrawn in July 2020. In July 2020, 82306 and 82308 were sold to Rail Operations Group.

Fleet list

 ‡ – DVT has been denamed

Mark 4 DVT

As part of the electrification of the East Coast Main Line from London King's Cross to Leeds, Edinburgh and Glasgow, 32 Mark 4 DVTs were built by Metro-Cammell, Washwood Heath for inclusion in InterCity 225 sets. The bodyshells were manufactured under sub-contract by Breda in Italy. They operate with class 91 locomotives using the TDM system via UIC screened cables through the nine Mark 4 coaches of the rake. They have also operated with 89 and 90 class locomotives.

InterCity East Coast
All entered service with InterCity. As part of the privatisation of British Rail, all 32 were sold to Eversholt Rail Group in 1994 and were operated by successive InterCity East Coast franchise holders GNER, National Express East Coast, East Coast, Virgin Trains East Coast and LNER. In February 2001, 82221 was damaged in the Great Heck rail crash and subsequently scrapped. The standard practice is for the DVT to be marshaled at the southern end, adjacent to the first class carriages, to facilitate easy changeover of locomotives at Bounds Green and subsequently Neville Hill depots at the north end of King's Cross and Leeds stations respectively.

With the delivery of Class 800 and Class 801, mass withdrawals commenced in May 2019. Originally it was proposed that all the InterCity 225 sets be withdrawn by the end of 2020, but LNER decided to retain 10 sets until at least December 2021 to allow it to increase services. A limited number of sets will continue to operate in the new May 2022 timetable.

Grand Central
Grand Central would have used Mk4 coaches and DVTs on London Euston to Blackpool North services with Class 90 locomotives hauling six-carriage sets; however, these services were permanently abandoned on 10 September 2020, due to the negative effects of COVID-19 on passenger numbers All five were sold to Transport for Wales in 2021.

Transport for Wales
Transport for Wales introduced three four-car Mark 4 sets with Mark 4 DVTs on the Premier Service from Holyhead to Cardiff in September 2021. In 2021, Transport for Wales Rail purchased these three, plus five that had been overhauled for Grand Central.

Grand Union
Grand Union has proposed using Class 91 locomotives with Mk4 coaches and DVTs on its services from London Paddington to Cardiff Central and from London Euston to Stirling. In February 2021, the Welsh application was rejected.

Fleet list

 ‡ – DVT has been denamed

Mark 5 DVT

The Mark 5 DVT was to be part of British Rail's ill-fated InterCity 250 project on the West Coast Main Line. This would have resembled the Class 93 locomotive, but contain a driving cab, seating for standard class passengers and a small guard compartment.

Accidents and incidents
DVTs have been involved in very few accidents.

 Hatfield rail crash, October 2000, involving DVT 82200.
 Great Heck rail crash, February 2001, involving DVT 82221 which was withdrawn and scrapped after major damage to the DVT.

See also
 Cab (locomotive)
 Control car (rail)
 Control stand
 Push–pull train
 Driving Brake Standard Open

References

External links
 

BREL products
British Rail coaching stock
Train-related introductions in 1989